Tehran Club was an Iranian football club based in Tehran, Iran. It was the successor to Iran first football club Iran Club.

Honours
Tehran Annual Football Association Cup:
Champion: 1925

References

Defunct football clubs in Iran
Association football clubs established in 1923
Sport in Tehran
1923 establishments in Iran